The Icelandic Men's Basketball Company Cup, commonly known as the  Men's Company Cup (Icelandic: Fyrirtækjabikar karla), was an annual basketball competition between clubs in Iceland that was organized by the Icelandic Basketball Federation. It was Iceland's second-tier cup competition, and is not to be confused with Iceland's first-tier cup competition, the Icelandic Cup.

History and format
The Company Cup was founded in 1996 and its first edition, bearing the name Lengjubikarinn after its sponsor Lengjan, took place in October and November that year. It included all twelve Úrvalsdeild karla teams and the top four teams from the second-tier 1. deild karla. The first cup was won by Keflavík after it defeated KR in the Cup final, 101-107.

Its last edition to date was held in 2015 where Stjarnan defeated Þór Þorlákshöfn in the Cup finals, 72-58.

Title holders 

 
 1996 Keflavík 
 1997 Keflavík
 1998 Keflavík
 1999 Tindastóll 
 2000 Grindavík 

 2001 Njarðvík   
 2002 Keflavík 
 2003 Njarðvík 
 2004 Snæfell
 2005 Njarðvík 

 2006 Keflavík
 2007 Snæfell
 2008 KR 
 2009 Grindavík 
 2010 Snæfell

 2011 Grindavík 
 2012 Tindastóll 
 2013 Keflavík 
 2014 KR
 2015 Stjarnan

Source

See also
Icelandic Basketball Federation
Úrvalsdeild karla
Icelandic Basketball Cup
Icelandic Basketball Supercup
Icelandic Division I

References

External links
 Icelandic Basketball Federation 
 History of the Company Cup finals 

1996 establishments in Iceland
Men
Basketball cup competitions in Europe
Recurring sporting events established in 1996